German Namibians are a community of people descended from ethnic German colonists who settled in present-day Namibia.  In 1883, the German trader Adolf Lüderitz bought what would become the southern coast of Namibia from Josef Frederiks II, a chief of the local Oorlam people, and founded the city of Lüderitz. The German government, eager to gain overseas possessions, annexed the territory soon after, proclaiming it German South West Africa. Small numbers of Germans subsequently immigrated there, many coming as soldiers, traders, diamond miners, or colonial officials.  In 1915, during the course of World War I, Germany lost its colonial possessions, including South West Africa (see History of Namibia); after the war, the former German colony was administered as a South African mandate. The German settlers were allowed to remain and, until independence in 1990, German remained an official language of the territory alongside Afrikaans and English.

Language

Today, English is the country's sole official language, but about 30,000 Namibians of German descent (around 2% of the country's overall population) and possibly 15,000 black Namibians (many of whom returned from East Germany after Namibian independence) still speak German or Namibian Black German, respectively.  However, the numbers of German Namibians, rather than of Namibian speakers of German, are uncertain.  Many Namibians of German descent still speak German and prefer classification as Namibian Germans not as Afrikaners.

German Namibians retain a fully-fledged culture in German within Namibia, with German-medium schools, churches, and broadcasting. Television, music and books from Germany are widely popular in the community. Often German Namibian youth attend university or technical school in Germany. This is despite the fact that in most areas and in Windhoek, the broader lingua franca is Afrikaans while English is now often the sole language used in many other spheres such as government or on public signs and product packaging. Unlike in South Africa, German Namibians have not been absorbed into the larger Afrikaans- and English-speaking communities. However, virtually all German Namibians are fluent in Afrikaans and are either familiar with English or can speak it fluently.

History of German settlement

The first Germans in Namibia were missionaries, initially sent through the London Missionary Society and then later also the Rheinish Missionary Society. Both institutions worked closely together towards the end of the 18th century, as the Rheinish Missionary Society did not yet have any established facilities in Southern Africa. From 1805 the Albrecht brothers, followed by a number of other missionaries, settled in Southwest Africa. They engaged in cultural work, but also laid the groundwork for later colonisation.

Later traders arrived and after the landing of the ship Tilly in Lüderitz Bay in 1883, a rising number of German officials, settlers, workmen and soldiers. After Southwest Africa was officially declared a German colony in 1884, as well as receiving recognition by England, an increasing number of migrants arrived from Germany. This migration flow reached its high point during the first Lüderitz diamond discoveries.

Migration stagnated after the end of World War I, when Germany lost all sovereignty over its colonies in the Treaty of Versailles. The governance of Southwest Africa was transferred to South Africa by the League of Nations. During the subsequent 'south-africanisation' of Southwest Africa, around half of the remaining 15 000 German residents were deported with their farms being handed over to South Africans. This so-called 'degermanisation' policy only changed after the London Agreement of 23 October 1923, according to which the remaining Germans were afforded British citizenship. German immigration as well as the spread of the German language were also expressively encouraged. In all 3200 Germans took up the opportunity of acquiring citizenship.

At the start of World War II, South Africa aligned itself to the United Kingdom by a slim majority, and on 6 September 1939 South Africa officially declared war on Germany and the Axis. In 1939 those in Southwest Africa of German origin were put under house or farm arrest and then in 1940 transferred to South Africa to be interned in camps, where they would remain until 1946. From 1942 their British citizenship, afforded to them in 1923, was revoked.

The Apartheid policy of South Africa came under increasing criticism and resulted in the founding and strengthening of the black resistance movement, including in Southwest Africa. At this time  relations between the South African government and the German population were warming, leading to an increase in migration from Germany being viewed more favourably.

Communities

Most of the current German Namibians are descendants of farmers, officials, craftsmen and relatives of the so-called Schutztruppe (protection troops) as well as descendants of the migration waves following both of the world wars. Since around 1980, an increase in tourism has led to a rise in ownership of holiday and retirement homes by Germans.  many Germans in Namibia are small and medium entrepreneurs.

Many German-speakers live in the capital, Windhoek, and in smaller towns such as Swakopmund, Lüderitz and Otjiwarongo, where German architecture, too, is highly visible. Many German Namibians are prominent in business, farming, and tourism or as governmental officials. For example, the first post-independence mayor of Windhoek, Björn von Finckenstein, is a German Namibian. The interests of the community are frequently voiced through Africa's only German-language daily, Die Allgemeine Zeitung. The Goethe-Institut in Windhoek lobbies on behalf of the German community. The legacy of German colonisation in Namibia can also be seen in the Lutheran Church, which is the largest religious denomination in the country.

Many place names in Namibia carry names of German origin. The main road in the capital city, Windhoek, retained the name Kaiserstrasse ("Emperor Street") until Namibian independence in 1990.

Decline

The percentage of the population of Namibia formed by Germans has declined recently, spurring speculation that the overall number of German Namibians is decreasing.  The decline in the percentage of German Namibians is mainly due to their low birth rates and the fact that other Namibian ethnic groups have higher birth rates and bigger families. Unlike other southern African white groups, emigration to Europe, Australia or North America is not common. German Namibians tend to emigrate instead to South Africa.

According to the 2001 Census, only 1.1% of all Namibian households use German as a home language (3,654 households), which is much less than that for Afrikaans (39,481 or 11.4%) or English (6,522 or 1.9%).

As per the 2011 census, 0.9% of all Namibian households used German as a home language (4,359 households), as compared to 10.4% using Afrikaans (48,238) and 3.4% using English (15,912). German is spoken by only 0.3% of the rural Namibians as compared to 1.7% of the urban Namibians. The maximum concentration can be found at Erongo (2.8%), Khomas (2.6%) and Otjozondjupa (1.4%).

Education
Deutsche Höhere Privatschule Windhoek, a German international school, is in the country's capital, Windhoek.

List of notable German Namibians
 Dieter Aschenborn (1915–2002), painter
 Uli Aschenborn (born 1947), South African-born Namibian animal painter
 Chris Badenhorst (born 1965), South West African-born former Springbok test rugby union player 
 Beate Baumgartner (born 1983), Namibian-born Austrian singer
 Monica Dahl (born 1975), swimmer
 Klaus Dierks (1936–2005), government minister
 Till Drobisch (born 1993), road bicycle racer
 Kerstin Gressmann (born 1994), tennis player
 Otto Herrigel (1937–2013), lawyer, businessman, and politician
 Erik Hoffmann (born 1981), road bicycle racer
 Adolph Jentsch (1888–1977), South West African artist
 Friedrich Wilhelm Kegel (d. 1948), South West African businessman
 Ingeborg Körner (born 1929), South West African-born German actress
 Richard Kunzmann (born 1976), novelist
 Bradley Langenhoven (born 1983), rugby union player
 Jörg Lindemeier (born 1968), swimmer
 Anton Lubowski (1952–1989), South West African anti-apartheid activist
 Henning Melber (born 1950), political activist
 Oliver Risser (born 1980), footballer
 Wilko Risser (born 1982), Namibian-German footballer
 Friedhelm Sack (born 1956), sport shooter
 Wolfgang Schenck (1913–2010), South West African-born German World War II fighter ace
 Calle Schlettwein (born 1954), politician and current Minister of Finance
 Bernard Scholtz (born 1990), cricketer
 Nicolaas Scholtz (born 1986), cricketer
 Phillip Seidler (born 1998), swimmer
 EES (Eric Sell, born 1983), rapper
 Hans Erik Staby (1935–2009), politician and architect
 Manfred Starke (born 1991), footballer
 Sandra Starke (born 1993), Namibian-born German footballer
 Gerhard Tötemeyer (born 1935), Namibian professor and former politician
 Raimar von Hase (born 1948), farmer and leader of the Namibia Agricultural Union
 Günther von Hundelshausen (born 1980), footballer
 Hellmut von Leipzig (1921–2016), Namibian-German World War II recipient of the Knight's Cross of the Iron Cross
 Anoeschka von Meck (born 1967), Afrikaans-language author
 Anton von Wietersheim (born 1951), politician
 Ludwig (Lu) Carbyn (born 1941), Zoologist, University professor, Conservationist

See also
 Germany–Namibia relations
 Ethnic Germans
 German South West Africa
 Deutscher Pfadfinderbund Namibia
 Namibian Americans

References

External links
German Website of some German Namibians in Europe/Germany

!
White Namibian people
 
German minorities
Namibia
European diaspora in Africa
Ethnic groups in Namibia
Germany–Namibia relations
Namibia
Namibia
History of Namibia